Suns may refer to:

Gold Coast Suns, Australian rules football team
Phoenix Suns, basketball team
The Sun, the star of the solar system
Stars, massive balls of plasma
Sun (unit), or cun, a traditional Chinese unit of length
An abbreviation for solar masses, solar radii, solar luminosities, or solar energy concentration
Tshwane Suns, South African basketball team

See also
 Sun (disambiguation)